Kilmore West is a locality within Dublin 5, situated on Dublin's Northside, Ireland. Located in the Dublin 5 district, it borders Santry, Beaumont, Artane, and Coolock. It is part of the larger Kilmore area.

Kilmore West has national schools for both boys and girls, Scoil Fhursa and Scoil Ide, respectively.  It also has its own parish and Roman Catholic church, St. Luke the Evangelist, with the parish priest being, as of 2022, Fr. Gary. The full Roman Catholic parish name is Kilmore Road West, the original townland of Kilmore Big being entirely to the west of the Kilmore Road, in Artane.

Notable local activities include pigeon fancying and boxing, both based in the local community centre. Soccer also commands the allegiance of a large section of the community as does Gaelic football. Sea angling, while not possible in this inland suburb, is also a popular local pastime.

See also 
 Kilmore

References

Coolock